The rufous-naped bellbird (Aleadryas rufinucha), or rufous-naped whistler, is a species of bird in the family Oreoicidae. It is assigned to the monotypic genus Aleadryas. It is found on New Guinea, where its natural habitat is subtropical or tropical moist montane forests.

References

External links
Image at ADW

Oreoicidae
Birds described in 1874
Taxonomy articles created by Polbot
Taxa named by Philip Sclater
Endemic fauna of New Guinea